Lyclene acteola is a moth of the family Erebidae first described by Charles Swinhoe in 1903. It is found in Taiwan and Thailand.

The wingspan is 21–22 mm.

References

Nudariina
Moths described in 1903
Moths of Taiwan
Moths of Asia